Boardman's Drainage Windmill is located at How Hill in the English county of Norfolk It is on the east bank of the River Ant close to the large Edwardian building houses the Norfolk Broads Study Centre. The structure is a grade II* listed building.

Description
Boardman's Drainage Windmill is of an interesting design being constructed from an open framed timber trestle method. The mill has a miniature cap, sails and fantail similar to the  traditional tower drainage mills which can be seen on other parts of the Norfolk Broads. The windmill was restored by the Norfolk Windmills Trust in partnership with the Broads Authority. Just to the north of this windmill on the same side of the river Ant is another small interesting drainage windmill called Clayrack Drainage Mill.

History 
Boardman's drainage windmill was built in 1897 by a local millwright Daniel England of Ludham. Trestle mills or Skeleton mills as they are sometimes described, were a later and less expensive alternative to a brick built windmill. As a result of their mainly timber construction very few have survived the ravages of the weather and of time. Boardman's mill is one of only three Trestle mills left on the Broads. The others being at Horning (OS Map Ref: TG344175) and at St Olaves (OS Map Ref: TM459995). The mill was originally fitted with a scoopwheel but this was later replaced with a turbine pump. Boardman's mill stopped pumping in 1938 when it was blown over in a Gale.

References 

Windmills of the Norfolk Broads
Smock mills in England
Grade II* listed buildings in Norfolk
Windmills completed in 1897
Windpumps in the United Kingdom
Grade II* listed windmills
Ludham